The A3 highway in Botswana is an  road that runs from Francistown city centre (where it is called Gemmel Drive) through Nata and Gweta, up to Maun then all the way to the A2 road on the outskirts of Ghanzi.

Main side roads

A30 road
A32 road
A33 road
A35 road

See also

 Mathangwane Village

Roads in Botswana